Zotalemimon costatum is a species of beetle in the family Cerambycidae. It was described by Matsushita in 1933.

References

costatum
Beetles described in 1933